The 2024 Washington gubernatorial election will be held on November 5, 2024. The top-two primary will be held on August 6.
 
As Washington does not have gubernatorial term limits, incumbent Democratic Governor Jay Inslee will be eligible to run for a fourth term.

Background
Washington has not had a Republican governor since John Spellman left office in 1985, the longest streak of Democratic leadership of any state in the country and the third longest streak of one-party leadership after South Dakota (which has not had a Democratic governor since Harvey L. Wollman left office in 1979) and Utah (which has not had a Democratic governor since Scott M. Matheson left office nine days prior to Spellman in 1985). Incumbent Governor Jay Inslee, who previously served in the U.S. House, was first elected to the governorship in the 2012 election and won reelection in 2016 and 2020, by increasing margins each time. According to the Seattle Post-Intelligencer, it is likely that he will become the first governor in Washington state history to win a fourth term in office if he were to seek it.

Primary election 
Washington is one of two states that holds a top-two primary, meaning that all candidates are listed on the same ballot regardless of party affiliation, and the top two move on to the general election.

Democratic candidates

Publicly expressed interest
Bob Ferguson, Washington Attorney General
Hilary Franz, Washington State Commissioner of Public Lands

Potential
Jay Inslee, incumbent governor and candidate for President of the United States in 2020

Declined
Dow Constantine, King County Executive

Republican candidates

Declared
Semi Bird, Richland school board member and chair of the Benton County Republican Party

Potential

Declined
Bruce Dammeier, Pierce County Executive (2017–present) and former state senator (2013–2017)

Independent candidates

Potential
Leonard Forsman, chair of the Suquamish Tribe

Polling

with Constantine, Dammeier, Ferguson, and Franz

with Inslee, generic Republican, and generic Democrat

General election

Predictions

Notes 

Partisan clients

References

External links
 
 
  (State affiliate of the U.S. League of Women Voters)
 

Official campaign websites
Semi Bird (R) for Governor
 Jay Inslee (D) for Governor

Washington
Jay Inslee
2024
Gubernatorial